Florence Lebrun (born 24 March 1959) is a French yacht racer who competed in the 1988 Summer Olympics, in the 1992 Summer Olympics, and in the 1996 Summer Olympics.

References

External links 
 
 
 
 

1959 births
Living people
French female sailors (sport)
Olympic sailors of France
Sailors at the 1988 Summer Olympics – 470
Sailors at the 1992 Summer Olympics – 470
Sailors at the 1996 Summer Olympics – 470
Mediterranean Games gold medalists for France
20th-century French women